General elections were held in Alderney on 22 November 2014 in accordance with the rules governing elections in Alderney. Five of the ten seats in the States were up for election.

Results

See also
States of Alderney Member

References

External links
Election results page

2014
2014 elections in Europe
2014 in Guernsey
November 2014 events in Europe